is a Japanese football player who plays for Fujieda MYFC.

Playing career
Yazawa was born in Yaizu on October 3, 1984. After graduating from Shizuoka Gakuen High School, he joined J1 League club Kashiwa Reysol in 2003. He played many matches as substitute offensive midfielder from first season. Although Reysol was relegated to J2 League end of 2005 season, he became a regular player from 2006 and Reysol was returned to J1 in a year. In 2008, he moved to Chiba Prefecture's cross town rivals, JEF United Chiba. Although he became a regular player soon, the club results were sluggish and was relegated to J2 end of 2009 season. In 2011, he moved to newly was relegated to J2 League club, FC Tokyo. FC Tokyo won the champions in 2011 season and was returned to J1 in a year. FC Tokyo also won the champions in 2011 Emperor's Cup. In August 2012, he re-joined JEF United Chiba. He became a regular player soon and played many matches every season. In 2016, he moved to newly was promoted to J2 League club, FC Machida Zelvia. He played many matches in 2 seasons. In 2018, he moved to J3 League club SC Sagamihara. In 2019, he moved to J3 club Fujieda MYFC.

National team career
In November 2003, Yazawa was selected Japan U-20 national team for 2003 World Youth Championship. At this tournament, he played all 5 matches.

Club statistics

1Includes Japanese Super Cup, J1/J2 Relegation Playoffs and Promotion Playoffs to J1.

References

External links

1984 births
Living people
Association football people from Shizuoka Prefecture
Japanese footballers
Japan youth international footballers
J1 League players
J2 League players
J3 League players
Kashiwa Reysol players
JEF United Chiba players
FC Tokyo players
FC Machida Zelvia players
SC Sagamihara players
Fujieda MYFC players
Association football midfielders